The Nutzotin Mountains are a mountain range in Alaska, United States and Yukon, Canada. They have an area of 829 km2 and form a subrange of the Alaska Range at its southeastern end. The mountains are located within Wrangell–St. Elias National Park and Preserve, and are named after the Nutzotin indigenous population who lived in the region. The portion of the range in the United States is split between the Southeast Fairbanks and Valdez-Cordova census areas.

See also
List of mountain ranges

References

Alaska Range
Landforms of Southeast Fairbanks Census Area, Alaska
Landforms of Chugach Census Area, Alaska
Mountain ranges of Yukon
Mountains of Unorganized Borough, Alaska